is a late Kamakura period Japanese castle located in the village of  Chihayaakasaka, Osaka Prefecture, Japan. Its ruins have been protected as a National Historic Site since 1934.

History
Kami-Akasaka Castle is located at a ridge extending from Mount Kongō on the border of Kawachi Province with the Yoshino region of Yamato Province. It was the center of a defensive position which included many smaller fortifications on surrounding hills. Shimo-Akasaka Castle is located at a lower level opposite a small river. In 1331, when Emperor Go-Daigo attempted to overthrow the Kamakura shogunate in the Genkō War, he relied on Prince Moriyoshi and a local lord from the Chihaya-Akasaka area, Kusunoki Masashige to raise an army. However, this first attempt failed, and Emperor Go-Daigo was captured and exiled to the Oki Islands and Kusunoki Masashige faked his death at the Siege of Akasaka and escaped into the deep mountains of his own territory where he constructed Kami-Akasaka Castle and Chihaya Castle.

The castle was consisted of several enclosures protected by dry moats, spread over the mountain and formed a letter "H" connecting two peaks and the intervening saddle. From the entry to the inner enclosures was a narrow path with several gates. In early 1333, Kusunoki Masashige joined forces with Prince Moriyoshi and recovered Shimo-Akasaka Castle and resumed his offense against the shogunate. The shogunate responded with a large army which laid siege to Kami-Akasaka Castle, which was defended by Kusunoki Masashige's brother Kusunoki Masasue. The castle fell after two weeks, once the shogunate army had managed to break the water supply to the defenders.

After the Kenmu restoration, Kami-Akasaka Castle continued to be used as a base for the Southern Court during the wars of the Nanboku-chō period, but fell to Northern Court forces in 1360. It is now largely ruins with little remaining evidence of the original structure.

Gallery

See also
List of Historic Sites of Japan (Osaka)

References

Further reading

Frederic, Louis (2002). "Chihaya-jō." Japan Encyclopedia. Cambridge, Massachusetts: Harvard University Press.
Sansom, George (1961). "A History of Japan: 1334-1615." Stanford, California: Stanford University Press. pp123–4
Turnbull, Stephen (1998). 'The Samurai Sourcebook'. London: Cassell & Co.

External links

Buildings and structures completed in 1332
1330s establishments in Japan
Castles in Osaka Prefecture
Historic Sites of Japan
Kawachi Province
Chihayaakasaka